Pirenees league (Catalan: Lliga dels Pirineus) is an international handball competition organized by the Catalan Federation of Handball and the Ligue Languedoc Roussillon. The teams are the best two of every federation. It was impulsed by the Catalan Federation in 1997.

FC Barcelona Handbol is the best team at this time.

Champions 
 1997: FC Barcelona
 1998: FC Barcelona
 1999: FC Barcelona
 2000: FC Barcelona
 2001: FC Barcelona
 2002: Montpellier HB
 2003: FC Barcelona
 2004: Montpellier Handball
 2005: FC Barcelona
 2006: FC Barcelona
 2007: FC Barcelona

Editions played

Lliga dels Pirineus 1997 
 Host: Andorra la Vella
 Semifinals
 Montpellier H. - BM Granollers 25-26
 FC Barcelona - Nice Handball 27-19
 Final
 BM Granollers - FC Barcelona 26-35

Lliga dels Pirineus 1998 
 Host: Carcassonne
 Semifinals
 FC Barcelona - Nïmes Gard H. 36-13
 Montpellier H. - BM Granollers 24-26
 Final
 BM Granollers - FC Barcelona 25-41

Lliga dels Pirineus 1999 
 Host: Sant Feliu de Llobregat
 Semifinals
 BM Granollers - Sporting Toulouse 31 25-24
 FC Barcelona - Montpellier H. 29-16
 Final
 BM Granollers - FC Barcelona 18-24

Lliga dels Pirineus 2000 
 Host: Toulouse
 Semifinals
 BM Granollers - Toulouse Spacer's 35-19
 FC Barcelona - Montpellier H. 31-29
 Final
 BM Granollers - FC Barcelona 24-27

Lliga dels Pirineus 2001 
 Host: Cambrils
 Semifinals
 FC Barcelona - Sporting Toulouse 31 34-16
 BM Granollers - USAM Nîmes 23-18
 Final
 BM Granollers - FC Barcelona 17-31

Lliga dels Pirineus 2002 
 Host: Agde
 Semifinals
 FC Barcelona - Paris Saint Germain 27-19
 BM Granollers - Montpellier Handball 22-27
 Final
 Montpellier Handball - FC Barcelona 26-22

Lliga dels Pirineus 2003 
 Host: Montcada i Reixac
 Semifinals
 FC Barcelona - US Créteil 32-23
 Montpellier Handball - BM Granollers 31-28
 Final
 FC Barcelona - Montpellier Handball 36-26

Lliga dels Pirineus 2004 
 Host: Montpellier
 Semifinals
 USAM Nîmes - FC Barcelona 22-34
 Montpellier Handball - BM Granollers 30-24
 Final
 Montpellier Handball - FC Barcelona 35-28

Lliga dels Pirineus 2005 
 Host: Vilanova i la Geltrú
 Semifinals
 FC Barcelona - US Créteil 31-28
 BM Granollers - USAM Nîmes 29-30
 Final
 FC Barcelona - USAM Nîmes 29-22

Lliga dels Pirineus 2006 
 Host: Nîmes
 Semifinals
 BM Granollers - USAM Nîmes 28-22
 FC Barcelona - Paris Handball 30-31
 Tercer lloc
 USAM Nîmes - Paris Handball 24-21
 Final
 FC Barcelona - BM Granollers 34-21

Lliga dels Pirineus 2007
 Host: Igualada
 Group A
BM Granollers 20 - USAM Nîmes 24
BM Granollers 22 - Montpellier HB 25
USAM Nîmes 20 - Montpellier HB 20
 Group B
FC Barcelona - 24 Paris Handball 13
Paris Handball 15 - CAI Aragón 20
FC Barcelona 21 - CAI Aragón 20
 Final round
BM Granollers 22 - Paris Handball 21 (5th-6th)
CAI Aragón - 38 Montpellier HB 30 (3rd-4th)
FC Barcelona 36 - USAM Nîmes 26 (Final)
 Final standings
 FC Barcelona
 USAM Nîmes
 Montpellier HB
 CAI Aragón
 BM Granollers
 Paris Handball

External links
Federació Catalana d'Handbol 
Ligue Languedoc-Roussillon de Handball 

Handball in Catalonia
Handball leagues in France